Plagioselmis is a genus of cryptophytes, including the species Plagioselmis punctata.

Plagioselmis was first described by Butcher in 1967 as a saltwater life form. In 1994, Novarino placed the freshwater Rhodomonas minuta into the genus, giving it the new binomial name of Plagioselmis nanoplantica. Nanoplantica is the only freshwater species in this genus. Rhodomonas was first described by Klaveness, who agreed with the reclassification.

The cells are comma-shaped and appear red or similar colors. Some strains within the genus appear to have a furrow, while other do not. Researchers have suggested that those without furrows should be placed into a new genus.

References

Cryptomonad genera